van Lerberghe or Vanlerberghe is a surname. Notable people with the surname include:

Bert Van Lerberghe, Belgian professional racing cyclist
Charles van Lerberghe (1861–1907), Flemish poet
Eric Vanlerberghe, Member of I Prevail
Henri Van Lerberghe (1891–1966), Belgian cyclist
Jennie Vanlerberghe, Belgian journalist
Jordi Vanlerberghe, Belgian footballer
Jurgen Vanlerberghe, Belgian politician
Myriam Vanlerberghe, Belgian politician
Oscar Vanlerberghe, Belgian politician

Surnames of Dutch origin